The Trouble with Angels is the tenth solo studio album by country pop singer Juice Newton. It was released by River North Records in 1998. Newton's previous studio album had been Ain't Gonna Cry (1989). After the release of that album she spent several years performing on concert tours and in night clubs. The Trouble With Angels marked her return to studio recording after nine years.

Overview
Juice Newton began her recording career in 1975 but did not achieve major stardom until the release of her 1981 album Juice.  The album was a crossover success and yielded three hit singles, "Angel of the Morning", "Queen of Hearts", and "The Sweetest Thing (I've Ever Known)".  The last of these peaked at number one on the Billboard Country Chart. She followed Juice with Quiet Lies (1982), an album that brought her two more hits, "Love's Been a Little Bit Hard on Me" and "Break It to Me Gently", of which the latter earned her the Grammy Award for Best Country Vocal Performance, Female.  Newton's 1985 album Old Flame was her country breakthrough, spawning three number one hits "You Make Me Want to Make You Mine",  "Hurt", and the duet with Eddie Rabbitt "Both to Each Other (Friends & Lovers)" and also three additional Top Ten hits: "Old Flame", "Cheap Love", and "What Can I Do with My Heart". After two more albums (Emotion and Ain't Gonna Cry) Newton concentrated more on concert performing.

In 1998, after an absence of nine years Newton re-united with Richard Landis, the producer of her earlier hits. The album that emerged, The Trouble With Angels, came together in a mere three weeks and was recorded over a period of only four days.  According to Landis, "There were no glitches.  Juice was a gem to work with, very prepared and professional. She recorded differently this time.  We used to do more stop and start with her vocals.  This was a much more straight-through performance.  We made a conscious decision to approach it more organically." The album, however, was not a full-fledged comeback, as Newton chose to make new recordings of seven of her earlier hits: "Angel of the Morning", "Ride 'Em Cowboy", "Love's Been a Little Bit Hard on Me", "This Old Flame", "Break It to Me Gently", "Queen of Hearts", and "The Sweetest Thing (I've Ever Known)". Some of these contained alternate phrasing and different arrangements. Regarding these alterations Newton stated, "I was very aware that you can't recreate the past, and frankly, we had no desire to make a carbon copy. The core of what a writer is still is there, but there's always a different interpretation."

The album's three remaining songs – "When I Get Over You", "The Trouble With Angels", and "Red Blooded American Girl" – were new to Newton's repertoire. "When I Get Over You" was chosen as the album's first single. It had been recorded by the band Venice on their 1997 album Born and Raised. After Newton heard it she bought Venice's album and brought the song to her producer, Richard Landis.  Speaking of the album's title track, Newton remarked, "I loved the line 'We've got pseudo big plans.' Sometimes if you've got these grandiose plans, you feel too greedy.  I sat there and immediately thought, 'Oh, wow, I've got to hear that again.'"

In his review of The Trouble With Angels music critic Stephen Thomas Erlewine lamented the reworking of earlier hits but still had some praise for the album: "Presumably, this course was taken with the idea that it would remind audiences of why Newton was a star, but the lack of new material is nevertheless quite disappointing for longtime fans.  That said, she's in fine voice on the record, and the album is hardly bad."

In 2011, all tracks from The Trouble With Angels were included (in remixed form) on a compilation album called The Ultimate Hits Collection.

Track listing

Personnel

Juice Newton − primary artist, clapping, background vocals
Eddie Bayers − drums
Spady Brannan − bass
Aubrey Haynie − fiddle, guest artist, mandolin
David Hungate − bass
Michael Johnson − dobro, steel guitar
Jeff King − acoustic & electric guitar
Richard Landis − bells, clapping, orchestra bells, producer, snaps, tambourine
B. James Lowry − acoustic guitar
Kerry Marx − electric guitar
Terry McMillan − castanets, guest artist, harmonica, percussion, tambourine
Jimmy Nichols − keyboards, organ, piano, synthesizer
Christopher Penn − clapping
John Wesley Riles − background vocals
Milton Sledge − drums
Harry Stinson − drums
Dennis Wilson − background vocals
Curtis Young − background vocals

References

1999 albums
Juice Newton albums
Albums produced by Richard Landis
River North Records albums